John Carter (died 1408) of Scarborough, Yorkshire, was an English politician.

He was a Member (MP) of the Parliament of England for Scarborough in 1386, September 1388, 1391 and January 1397.

References

14th-century births
1408 deaths
14th-century English politicians
English MPs 1386
English MPs September 1388
English MPs 1391
English MPs January 1397
Politicians from Scarborough, North Yorkshire